Iman Ali (born 19 December 1980) is a Pakistani actress,  model, and singer who appears in Urdu films.  Ali made her film debut with a leading role in the 2007 thriller film Khuda Kay Liye, for which she won a Lux Style Award for Best Actress. She has also starred as the main female lead in the 2016 film Mah e Mir, and had a supporting role in the 2011 social drama Bol.

Early life 
Iman was born on 19 December 1980, in Lahore, Pakistan.

Career 
Iman Ali first appeared in the serial Dil Dekay Jaien Gay followed by Arman, Kismat, Woh Tees Din, Pehla Pyar, and Kuch Log Roth Kar Bhi. In addition, she starred alongside Shehzad Roy in the first episode of the Geo News TV Serial "Chal Parha" which aired on Geo News in 2013.

In 2005, Iman Ali appeared in Ishq Mohabbat Apna Pan, also known as Anarkali video, in a seven-minute music video directed by Shoaib Mansoor. She made her screen debut with the leading role in the Zoheb Hassan's television series Kismat. Later, she co-hosted the Lux Style Awards in 2005 and appeared in television productions, which ended after her breakthrough into films.

In 2007, Iman Ali made her film debut in Shoaib Mansoor's Khuda Kay Liye opposite Shaan, Fawad Khan, and Naseeruddin Shah for which she received the Lux Style Awards for 'Best Actress' in 2008.  She appeared in a supporting role in Shoaib Mansoor's second film, Bol, opposite Humaima Malik, Atif Aslam, and Mahira Khan.

In 2015, she appeared in the lead role in Anjum Shehzad's Mah e Mir opposite Fahad Mustafa and Sanam Saeed. Iman Ali next starred in film Tich Button as Leena, which began production in 2019 and was released in 2022 on November 25.

Personal life
She's the daughter of actor Abid Ali and actress Humaira Ali. On 21 February 2019, she married Babar Bhatti, a Canada-based businessman and the grandson of Major Raja Aziz Bhatti, in Lahore. Iman's younger sister Rahma Ali is a singer and actress. Iman's maternal aunt Shama Chaudhry was also an actress.

Filmography

Television series

Telefilm

Film

Music videos

Awards and nominations

Galaxy Lollywood Awards

Lux Style Awards

International Pakistan Prestige Awards

See also 
 List of Pakistani models
 List of Pakistani actresses
 List of Lollywood actors

References

External links 
 
 
 

1980 births
20th-century Pakistani actresses
Pakistani female models
20th-century Pakistani women singers
Pakistani film actresses
Punjabi-language singers
Pakistani television actresses
Living people
Pakistani women singers
Punjabi people
Actresses from Lahore
Urdu-language singers
21st-century Pakistani actresses
Actresses in Urdu cinema
21st-century Pakistani women singers
Lux Style Award winners
People from Lahore